Saint Francois Township is an inactive township in Madison County, in the U.S. state of Missouri.

Saint Francois Township was established in 1845, taking its name from a variant name of the St. Francis River.

References

Townships in Missouri
Townships in Madison County, Missouri